This is a list of banks in Tajikistan.  In addition to the central bank, there are 17 licensed commercial banks as of September 30, 2018, including branches of foreign banks. Other deposit-taking and credit extending institutions in the country consist of 25 microcredit deposit organizations, 6 microcredit organizations and 31 microcredit funds.

Central bank 
 National Bank of Tajikistan

Commercial banks

Commercial banks in the process of liquidation 

 Agroinvestbank
 Tojiksodirotbank
 Tajprombank
 Fononbank
 Bank Asia (formerly Kont Investment Bank)
 NBP Pakistan Subsidiary Bank in Tajikistan

References

Tajikistan
Banks
Banks

Tajikistan